Southern Region units are excluded from this page, as they perpetuated the four-digit numbering series commenced by the Southern Railway - see SR Multiple Unit Numbering and Classification.

Prior to the introduction of TOPS, electric multiple unit numbers were allocated by British Rail regions in their own series. Diesel multiple units did not carry unit numbers at first, but the Scottish and Western Regions later adopted their own series for these units, whilst elsewhere individual depots allocated unit numbers, often prefixed by their two-letter TOPS depot code (e.g. TS for Tyseley).

When TOPS numbers were applied to multiple units, the unit numbers were prefixed by the class number to make the new six-digit unit numbers. These regional series have been perpetuated since TOPS because it eases the description of individual units and avoids potential confusion if there is only one unit with a particular identifier working in a certain area.

Diesel Multiple Units

London Midland Region
There was no regional number series for DMUs: individual depots had their own series, prefixed by their two-letter TOPS depot code. The table below shows the series used by Tyseley depot (in the Western Region until 9 September 1963).

Scottish Region
The table below shows the broad arrangement of numbers, though a couple of Class 104 units took numbers in the 3xx series. Class 107 units were later renumbered twice, first to 7xx following introduction of the Class 156 with 4xx unit numbers in the Regional Railways Sprinter series, and then to 0xx following introduction of the Class 158 with 7xx unit numbers in the same series.

Western Region
Unit numbers were prefixed by a letter (letters prior to 1970) to indicate which area (or depot) the unit was allocated to. The table below lists the prefixes used;  Tyseley had transferred to the London Midland Region by the time the 1971 changes took place so was not included, though it did shorten its prefix to TS.

The unit number ranges used were:

Before 1970 unit numbers were not generally painted on the ends of the units, but at some depots were carried on boards visible through the driver's cab windows. Also, each depot used its own number range within the overall scheme outlined above, so that there could be (and was) a Bristol-based Cross-Country set BL516 and a Cardiff-based set CDF516 at the same time! Inter-depot transfers meant frequent renumbering of sets, so that in about 1970 the fleet was renumbered into a common Region-wide series and from about 1972 permanent set numbers began to be painted (or applied by transfers) onto the ends of units, beneath the right-hand driver's cab window (as viewed looking directly at the front of the unit).

Network SouthEast
NSE adopted the former Western Region series, and expanded it to include diesel multiple units used on the former London Midland Region, which took unit numbers in the 7xx series. This included units from classes 101, 104, 108 and 117.

Regional Railways
Sprinter (Class 15x) units carried the last three digits of their carriage numbers in the 52xxx and 57xxx series. The 6xx series was reserved for the aborted Class 157, and was adopted by refurbished Class 143 601-625 and 101 651-695. Refurbished class 117 and 122 kept their Tyseley 3xx and Laira (Western Region) 1xx unit numbers respectively.

Electric Multiple Units

Eastern Region
When introduced, Class 306 were numbered 01-92 and Class 307 01s-32s. These numbers were amended as they were converted from 1500 V DC to 25 kV AC operation. Parcels and departmental units in the 99x series have included Classes 308/4, 302/9, 316 and 937.

London Midland Region

Scottish Region

British Rail numbering and classification systems
British Rail rolling stock